Mamadou Diakité (born 22 May 1985) is a former professional footballer who played as a defensive midfielder. Born in France, he made one appearance for the Mali national team in 2009.

Career
Diakité previously played for Al Ahli in Qatar, and previously played for FC Metz and R.E. Mouscron.

Diakité made one appearance for the Mali national team, in a friendly against Burkina Faso on 12 August 2009.

References

1985 births
Living people
People from Rosny-sous-Bois
Footballers from Seine-Saint-Denis
French sportspeople of Malian descent
French footballers
Citizens of Mali through descent
Malian footballers
Malian expatriate footballers
Mali international footballers
Mali under-20 international footballers
Association football midfielders
Ligue 2 players
Primeira Liga players
Belgian Pro League players
Serie B players
Nemzeti Bajnokság I players
FC Metz players
Vitória F.C. players
Royal Excel Mouscron players
Al Ahli SC (Doha) players
Budapest Honvéd FC players
F.C. Crotone players
Expatriate footballers in France
Expatriate footballers in Portugal
Expatriate footballers in Belgium
Expatriate footballers in Qatar
Expatriate footballers in Mauritania
Expatriate footballers in Hungary
Expatriate footballers in Italy
Malian expatriate sportspeople in France
Malian expatriate sportspeople in Portugal
Malian expatriate sportspeople in Belgium
Malian expatriate sportspeople in Qatar
Malian expatriate sportspeople in Hungary
Malian expatriate sportspeople in Italy